Mohammad Munir Bin Amran (born 7 November 1983) is a football player who plays as a midfielder.

Career
Munir started his career with Melaka TMFC in 2004. From 2006 to 2008, Munir played for Sabah FA. In 2009, Munir was signed by Felda United, and was instrumental in the club's successful promotion to Malaysia Super League by winning the 2010 Malaysia Premier League, but in 2011 he was transferred to Pahang FA. Munir is known as a professional free-kick taker from the team.

During the 2011 Malaysia Cup campaign, it was announced that Munir Amran would play with Negeri Sembilan FA on loan. This was the result of disqualification of Pahang FA from the campaign after losing to Sime Darby FC during the play-off game. In the 2013 season Munir changed clubs again, this time playing for Kuala Lumpur FA.

For the 2014 season, Munir were signed by PDRM FA, along with his Kuala Lumpur teammate Azizon Abdul Kadir.

References

External links
 Profile at PDRM FA official website

Living people
Malaysian footballers
PKNS F.C. players
PDRM FA players
Kuala Lumpur City F.C. players
Negeri Sembilan FA players
Sri Pahang FC players
Felda United F.C. players
1983 births
People from Johor
Association football midfielders